The following is a list of rectors of Exeter College, Oxford.

Rectors of Exeter College

1318–1566
John Parys (1318–1319)
Stephen de Pippecote (1322–1325)
John de Sevenaysshe (1325–1326)
John de Kelly (1326–1327)
Richard de Pyn (1327–1330)
Henry de Tiverton (1333–1344)
William Dobbe (1334–1335)
William de Palmorna (1336–1337)
John de Blankeswille (1344)
Robert de Trethewy (1354 – June 1357)
John Halle (1357 – Spring 1359)
John Wiseburg (May – October 1359)
Robert de Clyste (1359–1365)
Robert Blakedon (1365–1366)
John Otery (1367)
Thomas de Kelly (1368–1369)
William Franke (1370–1371)
John Dagenet (1371–1372)
Robert de Lydeford (1373–1374)
Martin Lydeford (1374)
John More (1374–1375)
Thomas Worth (1375–1377)
Thomas White (1377–1378)
Richard Browne (1378–1379)
Lawrence Stevine (1379 – March 1380)
William Talkarn or Talcaryn (March – October 1380)
William Slade (1380–1384)
Thomas Dyre (1385–1389)
Thomas Hyndeman (16 October 1389 – 2 April 1390)
Richard Mark or Marks (2 April 1390 – 1391)
Helias Stoke (14 October 1391 – 1393)
Robert Marschel (11 October 1393 – 1394)
John Gynne (1395–1399)
John Jakys (11 October 1399 – 1400)
Richard Penwyne (1400–1401)
Geoffrey Prentys (1401–1402)
John Cowling (1402–1404)
John Schute (1404–1405)
Thomas Noreys (1405–1406)
William Penbegyll (1406–1407)
William Fylham (1407–1408)
William Grene (1409–1411)
Walter Trengoff (1411–1413)
Benedict Brente (1413–1414)
William Fylham (1415)
John Alwarde (1416–1417)
Henry Whitehead (1417–1418)
John Alwarde (1418–1419)
Ralph Morewyll (1419–1422)
Edmund Fitchet (1422–1424)
John Colyforde (1425)
William Palmer (1425–1432)
John Rowe (1433–1440)
John Rygge (1440–1441)
John Lyndon (1441–1442)
John Westlake (1442–1443)
John Evelyn (1443–1447)
Richard French (1449–1453)
Walter Windsor (1453–1457)
William Mogys or Mogas (1457–1459)
William Thomas (1459–1460)
William Baron (1460–1464)
John Phylypp (1464–1470)
William Major (1471–1474)
Richard Bradleghe (1475 – 14 March 1478)
William Mylplaysh (14 March – 14 July 1478)
John Orelle or Oryal (4 July 1478 – 1479)
William Meryfeld (1479–1480)
James Babbe (1482–1484)
John Smythe (1485–1487)
Thomas Ruer (1487–1488)
Richard Panter (1488 – 20 December 1494)
Richard Roberd or Roberts or Robyns (Lent – October 1495)
John Atwell (1495–1499)
Thomas Michell (1499–1501)
John Rugge or Rigge (1501–1502)
Gerendus Raffe (1503–1504)
William Bery Bury (1506–1508)
Symon Todde (1512 – Summer 1514)
John Rugge or Rigge (1515–1516) 
Thomas Vyvyan (27 March 1518 – 8 October 1519)
William Smythe (1519–1521)
Philip Bale (14 December 1521 – 6 October 1526)
Edmund Fletcher (1526–1529)
John Bere (1529–1531)
John Pekyns (1531–1534)
John Bery or Bury (1534–1536)
John Dotyn (1537–1539)
John French (25 October 1539 – 1542)
Henry Laurence (17 October 1542 – 9 October 1543)
Augustine Crosse (17 October 1543 – 1546)
William More (17 October 1546 – 1553)
William Corindon or Corydon or Corndon (1553–1555)
Stephen Marks (17 October 1555 – 1556)
Philip Randell (17 October 1556 – 17 October 1557)
Robert Newton (17 October 1557 – 17 October 1559)
John Neale (18 October 1560 – 1566)

1566–1887
John Neale (Whitsuntide 1566 – deprived 12 October 1570)
 Robert Newton (31 October 1570 – resigned 4 October 1578 (see above))
Thomas Glasier (21 October 1578 – d. 9 March 1592)
Thomas Holland (24 April 1592 – d. 17 March 1612)
John Prideaux (4 April 1612 – resigned 3 August 1642)
George Hakewill (23 August 1642 – d. 2 April 1649)
John Conant (7 June 1649 – deprived 1 September 1662)
Joseph Maynard (18 September 1662 – resigned 30 April 1666)
Arthur Bury (27 May 1666 – deprived 26 July 1690)
William Paynter (15 August 1690 –d. 18 February 1716)
Mathew Hole (8 March 1716 – d. 19 July 1730)
John Conybeare (6 August 1730 – resigned 29 January 1733)
Joseph Atwell (17 February 1733 – resigned 3 March 1737)
James Edgcumbe (11 April 1737 – d. 16 May 1750)
Francis Webber (5 June 1750 – d. 29 September 1771)
Thomas Bray (22 October 1771 – d. 28 March 1785)
Thomas Stinton (15 April 1785 – d. 6 July 1787)
Henry Richards (23 July 1797 – d. 19 December 1807)
John Cole (7 January 1808 – d. 13 October 1819)
John Collier Jones (6 November 1819 – d. 7 August 1838)
Joseph Loscombe Richards (1 September 1838 – d. 27 February 1854)
John Prideaux Lightfoot (18 March 1854 – d. 23 March 1887)

1887–present 
William Jackson Jr (15 April 1887 – resigned 25 March 1913)
Lewis Richard Farnell (15 April 1913 – resigned 19 September 1928)
Robert Ranulph Marett (10 October 1928 – d. 18 February 1943)
Eric Arthur Barber (26 September 1943 – 1956)
Sir Kenneth Clinton Wheare (1956 – resigned 1972)
Greig Barr (1972 – resigned 1982) (d. 23 April 2008)
The Lord Crowther-Hunt (1982 – d. 16 February 1987)
Sir Richard Norman (1987 – d. 6 June 1993)
Marilyn Butler (1993–2004)
Frances Cairncross (2004–2014)
Sir Rick Trainor (October 2014)

References
'Exeter College', A History of the County of Oxford: Volume 3: The University of Oxford (1954), pp. 107–118. URL: http://www.british-history.ac.uk/report.aspx?compid=63875. Date accessed: 25 February 2008.

 
Exeter
Exeter College, Oxford